Jake Green may refer to:

 Jake Green (rower) (born 1994), South African rower
 Jake Green (voice actor),  American voice actor in films such as The Lego Star Wars Holiday Special
 Jake Green (Jericho), fictional character portrayed by Skeet Ulrich on the TV series Jericho

See also  
 Jacob Green (born 1957), American football player
 Jacob D. Green (fl. 1813–1848), African-American writer and lecturer
 Jack Green (disambiguation)